Seamen's Home is a three star hotel in Nuuk, Greenland. Housed in a distinctive red building, it has 41 rooms, 37 of which are en suite. 18 of the rooms overlook Nuuk Port. The hotel has four large rooms for the disabled.

The main restaurant for guests is the Cafeteria Garni.

The hotel also has a conference room for 30 people.

See also
 List of hotels in Greenland

References

Buildings and structures in Nuuk
Hotels in Greenland